The 1877 New South Wales colonial election was for 73 members representing 61 electoral districts. The election was conducted on the basis of a simple majority or first-past-the-post voting system. In this election there were 8 multi-member districts returning 20 members and 53 single member districts. In the multi-member districts each elector could vote for as many candidates as there were vacancies. 17 districts were uncontested. There was no recognisable party structure at this election.

There were four districts that did not have a residential or property qualification, Goldfields North (1,200), Goldfields South (1,500), Goldfields West (10,000) and University of Sydney (158). The average number of enrolled voters per seat in the other districts was 2,342 ranging from The Paterson (556) to The Bogan (7,401). The electoral boundaries were established under the Electoral Act 1858 (NSW).

Election results

Argyle

Balranald

Bathurst

The Bogan

Braidwood

Camden

Canterbury

Carcoar

The Clarence

Central Cumberland

The other sitting member William Long successfully contested [[Results of the 1877 New South Wales colonial election#Parramatta|Parramatta]].

East Macquarie

East Maitland

East Sydney

Eden

The Glebe

Goldfields South

Goldfields West

Goldfields North

Goulburn

The Gwydir

Hartley

The Hastings

The Hawkesbury

The Hume

The Hunter

Illawarra

Kiama

The Lachlan

Liverpool Plains

The Lower Hunter

Monara

Morpeth

Mudgee

The Murray

The Murrumbidgee

Narellan

The Nepean

The sitting member was Patrick Shepherd who did not contest the election. John Smith was the sitting member for Wellington.

New England

Newcastle

Newtown

Northumberland

Orange

Paddington

Parramatta

The other sitting member Charles Byrnes did not contest the election. William Long was the member for Central Cumberland.

The Paterson

Patrick's Plains

Queanbeyan

Shoalhaven

St Leonards

Tenterfield

The Tumut

University of Sydney

The Upper Hunter

Wellington

The sitting member was John Smith who unsuccessfully contested [[Results of the 1877 New South Wales colonial election#Nepean|Nepean]].

West Macquarie

West Maitland

West Sydney

The Williams

William Johnston had won the seat at the 1877 by-election. John Booth was one of the sitting members for [[Results of the 1877 New South Wales colonial election#East Macquarie|East Macquarie]].

Windsor

Wollombi

Yass Plains

See also 

 Candidates of the 1877 New South Wales colonial election
 Members of the New South Wales Legislative Assembly, 1877–1880

References 

1877